Na Nach is the name of a subgroup of Breslover Hasidim that follows the teachings of Rabbi Nachman of Breslov according to the tradition of Rabbi Yisroel Ber Odesser (called the Saba, or grandfather, by Na Nachs). The Saba is believed to have received an inspirational note, called the Petek (note), from the long-deceased Rebbe Nachman. Devotees of the group, colloquially called Na Nachs, make themselves quite visible in the streets of Tel Aviv, Jerusalem, Safed, Tiberias, and other Israeli cities as they dance atop and around moving vans to techno-Hasidic musical compositions, with the goal of spreading joy to passersby. They distribute their literature from sidewalk tables on the downtown streets and near bus stations, often accompanied by blaring music. They are identifiable by their large, white, crocheted yarmulkes bearing the name and song from the petek that Rabbi Odesser revealed: Na Nach Nachma Nachman Meuman. Besides publicizing this phrase on billboards and bumper stickers, Na Nachs and their admirers have made it a common graffito throughout Israel.

Notes

External links
 

Breslov Hasidism